Tony Björk (born 25 October 1983) is a Finnish footballer who represents Vasa IFK of Kakkonen.

References

External links

1983 births
Living people
Finnish footballers
Vaasan Palloseura players
Veikkausliiga players
Association football midfielders
Sportspeople from Vaasa